P'isaqiri (Aymara p'isaqa Nothoprocta (a kind of bird), -(i)ri a suffix, also spelled Pisakheri) is a  mountain in the Andes of Bolivia. It is located in the Oruro Department, Mejillones Province, La Rivera Municipality, south-west of Carangas.

See also 
 Pukara

References 

Mountains of Oruro Department